Nosy Crow is an independent children's publisher, based in London. The company was founded in 2010 by Kate Wilson, formerly MD of Macmillan Children’s Books and Group MD of Scholastic UK Ltd, Adrian Soar, formerly Book Publishing CEO of Macmillan Publishers, and Camilla Reid, formerly Editorial Director of Campbell Books. In 2020, the company was named Independent Publisher of the Year at the British Book Awards. As of 2021, Nosy Crow is the UK's 11th largest children's publisher, according to Nielsen BookScan data.

History

Nosy Crow was founded in 2010, and published its first book in January 2011. In its first year of publishing, it released 23 books and 3 apps in total, and invoiced one million pounds. The company has a strong background in rights-selling. Wilson began her career selling rights at Faber and Faber, and in its first year, foreign rights to Nosy Crow titles were sold in 16 languages. By September 2014, Nosy Crow had grown to become the 16th largest children’s publisher in the UK, according to Nielsen Bookscan data, and by 2019, the company had grown to become the 12th largest children’s publisher in the UK. The company has been noted on multiple occasions for its rapid growth in an industry experiencing shrinking revenue elsewhere.

Books

Nosy Crow publishes commercial fiction and non-fiction books for children aged from 0 to 14. Its most successful series to date include the Bizzy Bear books, illustrated by Benji Davies, and the Pip and Posy books, illustrated by Axel Scheffler, each of which have sold several million copies worldwide. The Pip and Posy books were credited with producing healthier than expected sales in the industry overall for 2011. Wilson had previously collaborated with Scheffler at Macmillan, where she published The Gruffalo and initiated the long-running collaboration between the artist and former Children's Laureate Julia Donaldson.

Other successful titles and series include Open Very Carefully, winner of the 2014 Waterstones Children's Book Prize, the My Brother is a Superhero series, written by David Solomons, which has sold in over 20 languages worldwide and been awarded the 2016 Waterstones Children's Book Prize and the 2016 British Book Industry Award Children's Book of the Year Prize, Pamela Butchart's Baby Aliens series, which has won a Blue Peter Book Award and a Children's Book Award, the Felt Flaps series by Ingela P. Arrhenius, winner of the Sainsbury's Children's Book of the Year Award, There's a Bear on My Chair by Ross Collins, winner of the inaugural Amnesty CILIP Greenaway Honour in 2016 and a UKLA Book Award in 2017, and I Am The Seed That Grew The Tree: A Nature Poem For Every Day Of The Year, winner of the inaugural Waterstones Children’s Gift of the Year Award in 2018.

Apps

Nosy Crow was particularly notable for its original apps for the iOS platform., which it developed in-house. Between 2011 and 2018, Nosy Crow released over 25 apps, which won numerous awards and received critical acclaim, earning the company recognition as a leader in the field. In April 2018, the company announced that it would cease its in-house app development programme and close its app department, citing the challenging commercial environment for children's reading apps.

Partnerships

Nosy Crow has become well known for its partnerships, with international publishers, charities, and other organisations. In North America, many of the company's illustrated book titles are published under an imprint of the same name by Candlewick Press, and in Australia, Nosy Crow books are distributed by Allen & Unwin. In November 2012, the company made headlines by creating an instant picture book edition of the John Lewis Christmas television advert, in partnership with John Lewis. The company has since produced picture book editions of several further John Lewis Christmas television adverts, in 2013, 2014, 2016 and 2017. In September 2014, the company announced a partnership with The National Trust, to publish a jointly-branded children's book list, and in October 2015, Nosy Crow announced a second partnership with The British Museum for another jointly-branded children's book list.

Awards

Since being established, Nosy Crow has won a number of awards, both for its books and apps, and as a company. These include:

Business Awards
 British Book Awards: Independent Publisher of the Year 2020, Children's Publisher of the Year 2019, Children's Publisher of the Year 2017
 Queen's Award for Enterprise: International Trade (April 2018)
 IPG Independent Publishing Awards: Marketing Award (May 2019); International Achievement Award (March 2018); Children’s Publisher of the Year (February 2017); Independent Publisher of the Year, Children's Publisher of the Year (March 2016); Digital Marketing Award, Young Independent Publisher of the Year (March 2015); Digital Marketing Award, International Achievement of the Year (March 2014); Children's Publisher of the Year, International Achievement of the Year (March 2013); Newcomer of the Year, Children's Publisher of the Year, Innovation of the Year (March 2012)
 Stationers’ Company Innovation Excellence Award - June 2014
 Nectar Small Business Award: Small Business of the Year - September 2014
 Growing Business Award: Young Company of the Year - November 2014
 Mumpreneur Award: Inspirational Business Mum (Kate Wilson) - October 2011

Book Awards
 Waterstones Children's Gift of the Year (I Am The Seed That Grew The Tree: A Nature Poem For Every Day Of The Year) - November 2018
 Sainsbury’s Children’s Book Award: Children’s Book of the Year (Where's Mr Lion?) - August 2017
 UKLA Book Award: 3 to 6 Category (There's a Bear on My Chair) - June 2017
 Tir Na n-Og Award: Best English language children's book (Sweet Pizza) - June 2017
 Amnesty CILIP Greenaway Honour (There's a Bear on My Chair) - June 2016
 Children's Book Award: Overall Winner (My Headteacher is a Vampire Rat) - May 2016
 British Book Industry Award: Children's Book of the Year (My Brother is a Superhero) - May 2016
 Waterstones Children's Book Prize: Overall Winner (My Brother is a Superhero) - March 2016
 Tir Na n-Og Award: Best English language children's book (Cow Girl) - May 2015
 Blue Peter Book Award: Best Story (The Spy Who Loved School Dinners) - March 2015
 Waterstones Children's Book Prize: Picture Book Category Winner (Open Very Carefully) - April 2014

App Awards
 FutureBook Awards: Best Children’s Digital Book (Goldilocks and Little Bear) - December 2016; Best Children’s Digital Book (Snow White) - December 2015; Best Children's Fiction Digital Book (Jack and the Beanstalk), Most Inspiring Digital Publishing Person (Kate Wilson) - November 2014; Best Children's Digital Book (Rounds: Parker Penguin) - November 2013; Best Children's App (Cinderella) - December 2011
 UKLA Digital Book Awards: Digital Book Award (Goldilocks and Little Bear) - June 2016; Digital Book Award (Axel Scheffler’s Flip Flap Safari) - July 2015
 Booktrust Best Book Award: Best Tech (Little Red Riding Hood) - July 2014
 Publishing Innovation Award: App — Juvenile (Cinderella) - January 2012
 KAPi Award: Children's Book App or eBook (Cinderella) - January 2012
 iLounge Award: iPad Kid's App of the Year (Cinderella) - November 2011

References

Children's book publishers
2010 establishments in England